The Guadalquivir River (Spanish, Río Guadalquivir) is a river in Bolivia. It is a tributary of the Río Grande de Tarija, which flows into the Bermejo River and the Paraguay River. The river flows by the city of Tarija.

See also

 List of rivers of Bolivia

References

Rivers of Tarija Department
Tributaries of the Paraguay River